Akashi was a Japanese repair ship, serving during World War II. She was the only specifically designed repair ship operated by the Imperial Japanese Navy. The navy based her design on the US Navy's USS Medusa.

Construction

In 1937 the Imperial Japanese Navy had converted the old battleship Asahi to serve as a repair ship. After the conversion of Asahi, a decision was made to build a dedicated repair ship with better capabilities for that task. The Imperial Japanese Navy planned for her to carry out 40% of the repairs needed by the Combined Fleet (needing approximately 140,000-man-hours). Therefore, she was equipped with the latest machine tools imported from Germany.

War service

During the war Akashi operated out of the Japanese base in the Truk atoll where she repaired various types of battle-damaged Japanese warships, including Shōkaku in October 1942 and Yamato in December 1943. In February 1944 the Americans made a raid on Truk (Operation Hailstone), sinking and damaging many ships. Akashi was damaged in these attacks and escaped to the Japanese atoll of Palau.

Fate

On 30 March 1944, while anchored off Urukthapel in the Palau Islands, Akashi was hit numerous times by bombs and rockets from American aircraft from Task Group 58, during Operation Desecrate One. She was sunk in shallow water with her bridge still remaining above the water.

Ships in class

Bibliography
, History of Pacific War Vol.51 The truth histories of the Japanese Naval Vessels part-2, Gakken (Japan), August 2005, 
Ships of the World special issue Vol.47 Auxiliary Vessels of the Imperial Japanese Navy, Kaijinsha, (Japan), March 1997
The Maru Special, Japanese Naval Vessels No.34 Japanese Auxiliary vessels, Ushio Shobō (Japan), December 1979
Senshi Sōsho Vol.31, Naval armaments and war preparation (1), "Until November 1941", Asagumo Simbun (Japan), November 1969
Senshi Sōsho Vol.88, Naval armaments and war preparation (2), "And after the outbreak of war", Asagumo Simbun (Japan), October 1975

References

External links
 Tabular record of Akashi's movements

Auxiliary ships of the Imperial Japanese Navy
World War II naval ships of Japan
Ships sunk by US aircraft
1938 ships
Maritime incidents in March 1944
World War II shipwrecks in the Pacific Ocean